Chain link fence may refer to:

 Chainlink, a type of fencing
 "Maschen-Draht-Zaun" ("chain-link fence"), a song by German entertainer Stefan Raab
 "Chain Link Fence", a song by English band The Go! Team from the album Semicircle